Drybrook Halt railway station served the village of Drybrook, Gloucestershire, England, from 1907 to 1930 on the Mitcheldean Road & Forest of Dean Junction Railway.

History 
The station was opened on 4 November 1907 by the Great Western Railway. It closed on 7 July 1930.

References 

Disused railway stations in Gloucestershire
Former Great Western Railway stations
Railway stations in Great Britain opened in 1907
Railway stations in Great Britain closed in 1930
1907 establishments in England
1930 disestablishments in England